Józef Szymański (31 January 1926 – 24 August 2016) was a Polish bobsledder. He competed in the four-man event at the 1956 Winter Olympics.

References

External links
 

1926 births
2016 deaths
Polish male bobsledders
Olympic bobsledders of Poland
Bobsledders at the 1956 Winter Olympics
People from Sanok County